The Scaled Composites 401 is an American experimental aircraft, designed and produced by Scaled Composites of Mojave Spaceport, Mojave, California, introduced in 2017. The two examples built were constructed for an unnamed customer to  demonstrate "advanced, low-cost manufacturing techniques" for the production of research aircraft for both industry and government.

First flight was on 11 October 2017.

Design and development
The Model 401 is a single-seat experimental prototype of broadly conventional configuration. The pressurized cockpit is enclosed by a bubble canopy and the plane incorporates a single jet engine and retractable tricycle landing gear.

A low-wing cantilever monoplane, it has lightly swept constant-chord wings with trapezoidal inner sections. It has a butterfly or V tail.

The aircraft is made from composite material. The engine used is a single Pratt & Whitney Canada JT15D-5D powerplant, producing  of thrust.

Specifications (401)

References

External links
Official first flight press release 

401
Low-wing aircraft
Experimental aircraft
Aircraft first flown in 2017
Single-engined jet aircraft
2010s United States experimental aircraft
V-tail aircraft
Stealth aircraft